STR, StR, Str or str may refer to:

Organizations 

Scuderia Toro Rosso, a Formula One motor racing team
Séminaire Saint-Joseph de Trois-Rivières, a school in Quebec
Sociedade da Terra Redonda, a Brazilian atheist and critical thinking organization
South Tynedale Railway, an English heritage railway
Specialized Technology Resources, an American corporation
STR, Inc hotel industry data company, formerly Smith Travel Research
Stranraer Harbour railway station code
Stuttgart Airport, Germany, IATA code

Science, medicine, and technology 

 Short tandem repeat or microsatellite, in a genome
 Special Theory of Relativity
 Specialty registrar (StR), UK medical title
 Suspend to RAM, S3 power state in computing
 Synchronous transmit-receive, an IBM communications protocol
 Jaguar STR, a car
 Sort-Tile-Recursive, bulk-loading method for an R-Tree data structure
 str or STR, term for character string or function in some programming languages, see Comparison of programming languages (string functions)
 Swedish Twin Registry, a registry of twins in Sweden established in 1961
 Steps to reproduce, a sequence of actions that will reproduce a problem. Primarily used in software development.

Other 

 Short-term rental, self-contained apartment rented for short periods of time
 Silambarasan Thesingu Rajendar, (born 1983), known as S.T.R., an Indian film director
 Suspicious Transaction Report by a financial institution
 .str, a video file included in a PlayStation (PS1) video game and contains a cinematic played in the game